Dharampur was a village development committee in Jhapa District in the Province No. 1 of south-eastern Nepal. At the time of the 1991 Nepal census it had a population of 14,144. It was later merged with Satasidham, Panchgachhi and Shivaganj to form the Shivasatakshi municipality.

References

Populated places in Jhapa District